Parthenina willeminae is a species of sea snail, a marine gastropod mollusk in the family Pyramidellidae, the pyrams and their allies.

Description
The size of the shell varies between 2.6 mm and 3 mm.

Distribution
This species occurs in the Atlantic Ocean off Mauritania.

References

External links
 To Encyclopedia of Life

Pyramidellidae
Gastropods described in 2000
Invertebrates of West Africa